may refer to one of several mountains in Japan:

 Mount Akagi (Akagi Komagatake) a mountain in Gunma prefecture
 Mount Echigo-Komagatake (Echigo Komagatake), also named Uonuma Komagatake, a mountain in Niigata prefecture
 Hokkaidō Komagatake, an active volcano in Hokkaidō
 Mount Kaikoma (Kai Komagatake), a mountain in the Akaishi Mountains on the border of Yamanashi prefecture and Nagano prefecture
 Mount Kisokoma (Kiso Komagatake), a mountain in the Central Alps of Nagano prefecture
 Mount Koma (Hakone), a peak (Hakone Komagatake) of Mount Hakone in Kanagawa Prefecture.